Euura arcticornis is a species of sawfly belonging to the family Tenthredinidae (common sawflies). The larva feed within galls on the leaves of willows (Salix species). It was first described by Friedrich Wilhelm Konow in 1904.

Description of the gall
The yellowish-green gall is found on the underside of a leaf of the host plant. It is pear-shaped, sometimes has two or three lobes and is formed at an angle to the midrib. It can be smooth or hairy. The galls can be found on the leaves of tea-leaved willow (Salix phylicifolia) or its hybrids.

Distribution
The gall is found in northern Europe, from Great Britain and Ireland (local in the north of England, Scotland and Ireland), throughout Fennoscandia and in northern Russia (Kanin Peninsula and Yakutia).

References

Tenthredinidae
Gall-inducing insects
Hymenoptera of Asia
Hymenoptera of Europe
Insects described in 1904
Taxa named by Friedrich Wilhelm Konow
Willow galls